Bucklow was, from 1945 to 1950, a county constituency of the House of Commons of the Parliament of the United Kingdom. It elected one Member of Parliament (MP), elected  by the first past the post voting system.

History and boundaries 
The House of Commons (Redistribution of Seats) Act 1944 set up Boundary Commissions to carry out periodic reviews of the distribution of parliamentary constituencies. It also authorised an initial review to subdivide abnormally large constituencies (those exceeding an electorate of 100,000) in time for the 1945 election. This was implemented by the Redistribution of Seats Order 1945 under which Cheshire was allocated one additional seat, by splitting the constituency of Altrincham into two seats:

 Altrincham and Sale, comprising the two respective municipal boroughs; and
 Bucklow, comprising the bulk of the remainder of the constituency, comprising:

The Urban Districts of Bowdon, Cheadle and Gatley, Hale, and Lymm, part of the Rural District of Bucklow and the parts of the County Borough of Manchester currently in the constituency of Altrincham (the former parishes of Baguley, Northenden and Northen Etchells).

In 1945, the Bucklow area consisted of small towns and countryside surrounding the larger town of Altrincham, near the city of Manchester. It is now a suburban area within the  Greater Manchester conurbation.

Under the Representation of the People Act 1948 (which applied from the 1950 general election), Bucklow was abolished and divided between a number of constituencies:

 Cheadle and Gatley became part of the new constituency of Cheadle;
 Bowdon, Hale and the parts of the rural district of Bucklow were transferred to Knutsford;
 Lymm became part of the new Runcorn seat; and
 the parts now in Manchester were combined with Didsbury to form the new constituency of Manchester Wythenshawe.

Members of Parliament

Election results

See also
List of former United Kingdom Parliament constituencies
History of parliamentary constituencies and boundaries in Cheshire

References

 Boundaries of Parliamentary Constituencies 1885-1972, compiled and edited by F.W.S. Craig (Parliamentary Reference Publications 1972)
 British Parliamentary Election Results 1918-1949, compiled and edited by F.W.S. Craig (Revised edition - Macmillan Press 1977)
 Who's Who of British Members of Parliament, Volume IV 1945-1979, edited by M. Stenton and S. Lees (Harvester Press 1981)

Parliamentary constituencies in Cheshire (historic)
Constituencies of the Parliament of the United Kingdom established in 1945
Constituencies of the Parliament of the United Kingdom disestablished in 1950